Five Nights at Freddy's: Sister Location is a point-and-click survival horror video game. Developed by Scott Cawthon, it is the fifth main installment of his Five Nights at Freddy's series and the sixth overall. The game was released on Steam and Game Jolt on October 7, 2016. Ports have also been released for Android, iOS, Nintendo Switch, Xbox One, and PlayStation 4.

Unlike previous installments, the player is able to move between rooms, each with its own different objective they must carry out. Throughout the game, the player interacts with a new cast of animatronic characters, central to which is a child-like animatronic named Circus Baby.

Five Nights at Freddy's: Sister Location received mixed reviews, with praise for its plot and voice performances, although they criticized some aspects of its gameplay. A sequel, Freddy Fazbear's Pizzeria Simulator, was released on December 4, 2017.

Gameplay
Five Nights at Freddy's: Sister Location is a survival horror video game where the player takes the role of a late night technician who must survive against murderous animatronics each shift. Unlike previous installments of Five Nights at Freddy's, the player can crawl between different rooms and the objective changes each of the five nights.

The occasional post-death minigames return from Five Nights at Freddy's 2; when a game ends, the player may be given a chance to play an 8-bit mini-game. In Sister Location, Circus Baby must give cupcakes to children and then bring an ice cream cone to a little girl, ending in the girl's death. Completing this minigame grants access to the Night 5 secret level; a near-recreation of the gameplay in the original Five Nights at Freddy's, bringing back survival gameplay.

Completing all five nights unlocks extra features: pictures and blueprints of the game's animatronics, their making-of, a map of the facility, and menu access to Circus Baby's cupcake minigame. As of the December 1, 2016 update, clearing all nights also unlocks the non-canon Custom Night mode, which is set in a modified version of the Night 5 secret room. The player can choose from several modes and difficulty settings, facing new animatronics, and must conserve both power and oxygen supplies in order to survive. Completing these modes allows the player to view a series of cutscenes that have been declared as part of the series canon; all except the last scene are in 8-bit resolution.

An achievement system exists in the form of four stars, obtained by unlocking both of the game's endings, completing the Circus Baby mini-game, and completing the hardest difficulty on each custom night preset. Completing each custom night preset on each mode grants its own star in the specific custom night mode.

Like in all Five Nights at Freddy's games, failure to defend oneself from the hostile animatronic characters will result in a jumpscare.

Plot
In a short opening, an interviewer questions William Afton on unspecified design choices he made while creating the animatronics.

The player controls Mike, a new employee of Circus Baby's Entertainment and Rental, which is an underground sister location of Freddy Fazbear's Pizza from the first game. He is guided by an artificial intelligence named HandUnit (Andy Field). HandUnit explains that their animatronics are rented out for children's birthday parties during the day: the player is tasked with maintenance of the animatronics every night until the next morning.

On the second night, the power goes out. The animatronic Circus Baby (Heather Masters) gives instructions to help the player survive against the animatronics and he resets the circuit breakers. The following night, he is ambushed by another animatronic and hidden in a a springlock suit overnight by Circus Baby. The player is left to repel the tiny Minireenas from crawling into the suit before freeing himself. On the fifth night, the player finds two hanged technicians where the animatronics should be, which prevents HandUnit from noticing they are missing. Circus Baby instructs Mike to destroy her empty body by going to the Scooping Room, where endoskeletons are violently "scooped" out of the animatronics' exterior, to "save what is good so the rest can be destroyed". She tells him that he is being followed by the animatronic Ballora, who intends to kill him.

Between nights, the player watches an animated sitcom at home and Elizabeth, Afton's daughter, is heard begging him to play with Circus Baby, despite her father's insistence that she stay away.

Endings 
If the player follows Circus Baby's instructions, they will find that all of the animatronics, including Ballora, had actually already been "scooped". Circus Baby's voice is revealed to be Ennard, an amalgamation of the animatronics, who uses the Scooper to eviscerate him and disguise itself in the player's skin to live among people.

Alternatively, the player must play an 8-bit minigame which sometimes appears after a game over, where the player controls Circus Baby. If this is completed in a certain way, Circus Baby is shown extending a claw from her stomach and pulling a little girl into it. This girl is implied to be Elizabeth, whose soul possesses the animatronic. The player is then able to disobey Circus Baby's instructions and enter a private room, where they must fend off Ennard until 6AM. Ennard is revealed to have followed them home.

A series of 8-bit cutscenes plays if the player completes each mode of Custom Night on the hardest difficulty. Ennard eventually abandons Mike's decomposing body, but Circus Baby's voice somehow reanimates Mike. In another cutscene, Mike is revealed to be Michael Afton, William's son, who has been "living in shadows" due to his disfigurement. He says that he found and freed "her" and resolves to find William; Springtrap emerges among the burned remains of Fazbear's Fright.

Development and release
Five Nights at Freddy's (FNaF) developer Scott Cawthon stated that Five Nights at Freddy's 4 (2015) would be the final game in the series. However, he announced Five Nights at Freddy's: Sister Location on his website in April 2016 with the tagline, "There was never just one." A trailer was uploaded online on May 21. The release date was later confirmed to be October 7. In October, Cawthon announced he was delaying the game to make certain dark plot elements more "kid-friendly"; this was revealed to be trolling.

Sister Location was first released on Steam. Shortly after, a patch was released that eased the difficulty of the fourth night. It was the first FNaF game to feature professional voice acting. The development of Sister Location was the longest in the series yet: the previous four were all released within a year. Rock Paper Shotgun believed that Cawthon was being more cautious after spin-off FNaF World (2016) was panned as "rushed"; retrospectively, The A.V. Club opined that "the extra time and care Cawthon put into both the game’s writing, and its production values" led to a "more ambitious sequel". 

Downloadable content for a non-canon Custom Night was later added. Sister Location was also ported to Android. On January 3, 2017, a mobile port for iOS devices was released on the App Store. In March 2020, Clickteam released a remastered version of the iOS port closer to the Steam version, as they had done with previous games. They also released a Nintendo Switch port on June 18. Ports for Xbox One and PlayStation 4 were released respectively on July 10 and July 21, while Maximum Games included the first five games in the Five Nights at Freddy’s: Core Collection, which was released for the Xbox One, PS4 and Switch on January 12, 2021.

Reception 

Five Nights at Freddy's: Sister Location received mixed reviews. Critics praised the voice acting, especially Masters. GameCrate and Kotaku praised the use of humor in addition to horror in the script—the latter noted an early scene where HandUnit glitches out and misinterprets the character's name as "Eggs Benedict". 

Destructoid rated the game 6/10, while GameCrate rated it 7.50/10. Rob Rich of Gamezebo gave the mobile version a decent review, giving the game 3 out of 5 stars, saying, "I don't necessarily think Sister Location is the worst mobile iteration of the FNaF series, but it's certainly not the best despite the overall improved visuals."

References

External links

2016 video games
Android (operating system) games
Clickteam Fusion games
Sister Location
2010s horror video games
Indie video games
Interquel video games
Nintendo Switch games
IOS games
PlayStation 4 games
Point-and-click adventure games
Single-player video games
Video games about robots
Video games developed in the United States
Video games with alternate endings
Windows games
Works about missing people
Xbox One games